The Implied Bill of Rights is a judicial theory in Canadian jurisprudence that recognizes that certain basic principles are underlying the Constitution of Canada.  

The concept of an implied bill of rights develops out of Canadian federalism.  When provincial legislation intrudes deeply into fundamental freedoms of speech, religion, association or assembly, the provincial legislature is creating criminal legislation, which under the distribution of powers is reserved exclusively to the Parliament of Canada by section 91(27) of the Constitution Act, 1867.

Provinces cannot intrude in this area; if they do, such legislation is void and has no effect.  Since provincial prohibitions touching on the fundamental freedoms of speech, religion, assembly and association were declared unconstitutional by the courts, and in light of the expansive obiters in the leading cases, the writers were able to claim that there was a bill of rights implicit in the Constitution.

Some constitutional scholars focus on the Preamble to the Constitution Act, 1867 as providing the underlying reasons for an implied bill of rights.  The relevant part of the preamble reads:

Some authors have taken the view that the words "similar in principle" means that in Canada there must be a parliamentary system of government, acting under the influence of public opinion, of a free press, with free speech.  Thus, legislation which destroyed the citizen's ability to debate, to assemble or to associate freely would be contrary to Canada's democratic parliamentary system of government.  This provides an additional underpinning for the claim of an implied bill of rights in Canada's Constitution.

Invoked more often before the Canadian Charter of Rights and Freedoms was enacted, it is nonetheless important when questions of parliamentary supremacy and the override power come into play.

History

Jurisprudence before 1982
The principal cases describing the extent of the rights are considered to include:

 Reference Re Alberta Statutes
 Boucher v the King
 Winner v SMT (Eastern) Ltd
 Saumur v Quebec
 Chaput v Romain
 Switzman v Elbling
 Roncarelli v Duplessis

In Alberta Statutes, Duff CJ held that:

Cannon J agreed, and also stated:

While Duff's and Cannon's dicta focused on the competence of the provincial legislatures, Abbott J later stated in Switzman that the same restrictions applied to the Parliament of Canada as well, declaring that "Parliament itself could not abrogate this right of discussion and debate."

The concept was expanded in Winner, which held that citizens were free to move across provincial borders and live wherever they chose to. Roncarelli later held that public officials were subject to the rule of law, and therefore could neither suspend nor dispense it arbitrarily, but must act within their official powers.

Post-Charter
The Supreme Court revisited the implied bill of rights theory in the Provincial Judges Reference.  The Court referred to both the Charter and the implied bill of rights theory to rule that governments may not compromise judicial independence.  As outlined by the majority the proper function of the implied bill of rights after the adoption of the Charter is to "fill in the gaps" in the express terms of the constitutional texts. However, while the Court stated that the theory was able to fill in the details of judicial independence, the Court actually relied on the Charter to do so. The Court fell short of using the preamble to state new constitutional obligations or limitations. Lamer CJ's extensive obiter did return Canadian constitutional theory to the classical model of rights implicit in the Constitution which was first developed in Alberta Press, Saumur and Switzman, noting:

The ideas outlined in Provincial Judges were developed further in the Reference re Secession of Quebec.  Together these two cases have been interpreted to expand the reach of unwritten constitutional principles.  The 1867 preamble and the Canadian Constitution (including its newer addition, the Charter) are read as a unified whole. The express provisions of the Constitution elaborate underlying, organizing principles.  These unwritten principles can shape "a constitutional argument that culminates in the filling of gaps in the express terms of the constitutional text" and that in "certain circumstances give rise to substantive legal obligations" that "are binding upon both courts and governments."

In Toronto (City) v Ontario (Attorney General), the Supreme Court held that unwritten constitutional principles could not serve as an independent basis to strike down legislation.

Notes and references

Notes

Notable cases

References

Further reading
 
 
 

Constitution of Canada
National human rights instruments